Visionaries is a 2001 Spanish romantic and religious drama directed and written by Manuel Gutiérrez Aragón. It stars Eduardo Noriega and Ingrid Rubio alongside Karra Elejalde, Fernando Fernán Gómez, and Emma Suárez.

Plot 
Featuring the backdrop of the alleged Marian apparitions that occurred during the Second Spanish Republic in the village of Ezkioga, Gipuzkoa, and the climate of integrist violence arising in reaction to secularization policies, the plot follows the doomed love story between Joshe (a wannabe teacher visiting the village in order to meet with his fiancée Edurne) and Usual, a maid working at the inn.

Cast

Production 
The film is an Aiete-Ariane Films and Sogecine production, and it had the collaboration of ICAA, Gobierno Vasco, Canal+ and TVE. Shooting locations included the Larraun Valley.

Release 
Selected within the lineup of the 49th San Sebastián International Film Festival's official selection, the film premiered in September 2001. Distributed by AltaFilms, it was theatrically released in Spain on 11 October 2001.

Reception 
David Rooney of Variety considered that while a prestige picture (owing to the high-profile cast and polished production values), the film is limited by "its lifelessly reverential approach, lack of emotional engagement and failure of the central romance to conjure any lasting resonance".

Ángel Fernández-Santos of El País considered that despite "a powerful synthetic start" and a captivating story (sketching a "magnificent gloomy portrait of closed and sexton Spain"), the denouement does not live up to promise upon the disappearance of father Laburu from the picture and the film loses some of its initial punch.

See also 
 List of Spanish films of 2001

References 

Spanish historical drama films
Spanish romantic drama films
2001 romantic drama films
Sogecine films
Films directed by Manuel Gutiérrez Aragón
Films set in 1932
2000s Spanish-language films
Films set in the Basque County
Films shot in Navarre
Religious drama films
2000s Spanish films